Maiden Blush or Maiden's Blush, also called Lady Blush and Red Cheek, is an apple cultivar used for both fresh eating and for cooking. It was previously a popular apple for drying, for which it is especially well suited due to its low juice content.

References

Apple cultivars
Agriculture in New Jersey